Eduardo "Bali" Bucca (born 23 June 1979) is an Argentine physician and politician of the Justicialist Party. He served as a National Deputy from 2017 to 2021, elected in Buenos Aires Province, and as intendente (mayor) of Bolívar, Buenos Aires from 2011 to 2017. Since 2021, he has been a member of the Buenos Aires Province Senate elected in the Seventh Electoral Section.

At the 2019 provincial elections, Bucca ran for the governorship of Buenos Aires in the Federal Consensus ticket, winding up in third place with 5.11% of the vote.

Early and personal life
Bucca was born on 23 June 1979 in San Carlos de Bolívar, Buenos Aires Province. He went to school at Colegio Cervantes and finished high school at the Colegio Nacional de Buenos Aires; he would later go on to attain a degree in medicine from Fundación Barceló, in 2002.

Bucca is married and has three children. He is a close friend of TV presenter and businessman Marcelo Tinelli, a fellow native of San Carlos de Bolívar.

Political career
Bucca successfully ran for a seat in the San Carlos de Bolívar city council in 2009. In 2011, he was elected intendente (mayor) of the city with 48% of the votes, and in 2015 he was re-elected with 54% of the votes. 

At the 2019 provincial elections, Bucca ran for the governorship of Buenos Aires as part of Federal Consensus, a coalition of dissident Peronists who did not join the Frente de Todos, as well as other smaller parties. Bucca ended up in third place with 5.11% of the vote.

National Deputy
Bucca ran for a seat in the Argentine Chamber of Deputies at the 2017 legislative election as the first candidate in the Cumplir Justicialist Front list; the list received 5.20% of the vote, and Bucca was the only candidate in the list to be elected.

From 2019 to 2021, Bucca was president of the Federal Consensus parliamentary bloc in the Chamber of Deputies. In August 2021, Bucca left the bloc and officially joined the governing Frente de Todos.

He did not run for a second term as deputy in 2021, and his term expired on 9 December 2021.

Electoral history

Executive

Legislative

References

External links

Profile on the official website of the Chamber of Deputies (in Spanish)

Living people
1979 births
People from Buenos Aires Province
Mayors of places in Argentina
Members of the Argentine Chamber of Deputies elected in Buenos Aires Province
Members of the Buenos Aires Province Senate
Justicialist Party politicians
21st-century Argentine politicians